The Battle of Little Belt was a naval battle between a combined Swedish/Danish/Prussian fleet and a fleet from Lübeck, during the Count's Feud. The battle ended in a heavy defeat for Lübeck.

Sources 
Ulf Sundberg: Svenska krig 1521-1814 [Swedish wars 1521-1814] (in Swedish).
Lars Ericson, Martin Hårdstedt, Per Iko, Ingvar Sjöblom, Gunnar Åselius: Svenska slagfält [Swedish battlefields] (in Swedish).
Emil Svensén, J.A. Lindblads förlag, Del 3 (1918): SVENSKA HISTORIEN

Little Belt
Little Belt
Little Belt
Little Belt
1535 in Europe
Little Belt